Boohoo Group plc is a British online fashion retailer, aimed at 16–30 year olds. The business was founded in 2006, and had sales in 2019 of £856.9 million. It specialises in own brand fashion clothing, with over 36,000 products. Growing rapidly, the company has acquired the brands and online presence of several defunct high street retailers, and also seen controversy over working conditions at some of its suppliers.

History
Boohoo was founded in 2006 by Mahmud Kamani and Carol Kane, who respectively serve as group executive chairman and an executive director, and who previously supplied high street chains such as Primark and New Look. The company completed its initial public offering (IPO) in March 2014, with its shares trading considerably above the 50p float price on the company's debut in the AIM sub-market of the London Stock Exchange. Valuing Boohoo at almost £600 million, the floatation saw Kamani net £135 million and Kane £25 million.

Boohoo has been criticised for promoting fast-fashion which critics claim comes at a cost to those making the clothes and the environment. More than half of Boohoo's garments are produced in the UK, especially Leicester, London, and Manchester. Boohoo buys 75%–80% of the clothing produced in Leicester. This was made possible when other retailers such as ASOS reduced the amount they sourced from Leicester over concerns about working conditions. In 2017, the Channel 4 television documentary series Dispatches found that factories in Leicester supplying Boohoo (along with New Look, River Island and Missguided) were paying workers less than the national minimum wage. Boohoo stated that the work had been subcontracted without their knowledge.

In August 2019, the online businesses of Karen Millen and Coast were bought out of administration by Boohoo for £18 million. Only the online employees were taken on by Boohoo and the standalone retail stores eventually closed. Early in the COVID-19 pandemic, Boohoo reported an increase in sales. In June 2020, Boohoo announced that it was to acquire the brands and websites of high street chains Oasis Stores and Warehouse for £5.25 million.

In late June 2020, workers' rights group Labour Behind the Label produced a report that stated factories supplying Boohoo were not following to social distancing and forcing employees to work even if sick, claims that Boohoo denied. This was followed by an investigative report by The Sunday Times which claimed to have found that workers producing clothes for Boohoo at a Leicester-based company were paid £3.50 an hour, less than half the UK minimum wage for over 25s. Boohoo again distanced themselves from the company, a representative stating "We are taking immediate action to thoroughly investigate how our garments were in their hands, will ensure that our suppliers immediately cease working with this company, and we will urgently review our relationship with any suppliers who have sub-contracted work to the manufacturer in question." Standard Life Aberdeen, an asset manager and a top 10 shareholder in the group, announced that it had sold most of its stake in the company a few days after the Sunday Times revelations. SLA said that after engaging with Boohoo's management team a number of times during the week, it found the online retailer's response to the allegations was "inadequate in scope, timeliness and gravity". On 15 July 2020 a Conservative Party MP said that it was 'shameful' that it took a pandemic for Boohoo to finally be taken to task for its workplace practices. Philip Dunne, chairman of the Environmental Audit committee, also said that the company had not met a pledge to join the Ethical Trading Initiative organisation which brings together retailers, unions and campaign groups to improve practice in supply chains.

In September the company accepted the findings of a report by Allison Levitt QC, which found that the allegations of poor working practices in the company's supply chain were "substantially true", that its monitoring of the factories was "inadequate" due to “weak corporate governance”, and that its failure to assess the risk to workers during the coronavirus pandemic were "inexcusable". In November 2020 it appointed former judge Sir Brian Leveson to provide independent ethical oversight. An investigation by The Guardian newspaper in December 2020 traced Boohoo's supply chain to factories in Pakistan where workers claimed to be paid as low as £47 a month, less than the legal minimum wage, and ordered to work to shifts as long as 24 hours without receiving full overtime pay.

In January 2021, following the collapse of the UK department store chain Debenhams, Boohoo bought the brand and online business for £55 million. The deal did not include the firm's stores or workforce, leading to a predicted loss of 12,000 jobs. In February, Boohoo announced it was buying the former Arcadia Group brands: Burton, Wallis and Dorothy Perkins for £25.2 million, confirming the loss of around 2,450 jobs.

In December 2021, Boohoo has announced the expansion of operations into five new markets within the Asian region including Japan, Korea, Singapore, Hong Kong and Taiwan. In August 2022, Boohoo implemented a £1.99 charge for returning products.

Business operations

According to Chief executive Carol Kane, Boohoo can differentiate itself from its closest rivals, as all their clothing ranges are own-branded with average prices of £17  comprising 9,000 clothing lines. With a primary focus on the 16–24 year old age group, it sells clothing to over 100 countries and  had seven major markets, including the UK, the US, and France. Stock is purchased in small quantities of between 300 and 500 items at a time, with repeat orders typically of 25% on those that sell well. Customers can order items up to midnight for next-day delivery, including on Sunday. Customer numbers increased by 29% throughout 2016–17, up to 5.8 million.

As an online retailer, Boohoo utilise social media as an integral part of their marketing strategy. A social media manager was appointed in 2012, with all employees encouraged to assist the social media team by contributing messages and imagery.  boohoo had 6m Instagram followers, 1.1m Twitter followers and 2.9m likes on Facebook.

Distribution centre
Since 2010 the company's main distribution centre has been located on the Heasandford Industrial Estate in Burnley, Lancashire. From an initial 40 employees, the site has rapidly expanded into Burnley's largest employer, with workforce exceeding 3,500 in 2021. The company has acquired more buildings on the estate, formerly occupied by manufacturers such as TRW Automotive, and plans to continue to grow in the town. Boohoo's head of logistics said in 2021, "Ease of distribution is key and the borough sits in the heart of the UK, whilst it also provides a skilled and varied workforce."

Corporate affairs
Boohoo also owns boohooMAN, PrettyLittleThing, Nasty Gal and MissPap, all targeted at 16–35 year olds. PrettyLittleThing was acquired in December 2016, with the retailer purchasing a 66% stake in the business at a cost of £3.3m, with the existing management team retaining the remaining shares.

During the year up to April 2017, customer browsing from mobile devices accounted for 70% of total sessions, an increase of 4% from the previous year, with downloads of its mobile app across the United Kingdom, United States and Australia totalling around 2.2 million.

Financial performance
In the 10 months to December 2013, Boohoo had sales totalling £92m, with a profit before charges of £10m. By February 2014, total sales had reached £110m, with profits of £11m.

Turnover in the year to February 2015 was £139.9m, an increase of 27% from the previous year, with an increase of gross profit by 31% to £85m.

In April 2017, Boohoo announced that its profits had almost doubled to £31 million on sales up 51% to almost £300 million. When the company was floated on the stock market in 2014, it was valued at £560m, and is worth about £2 billion  Internationally, the retailer suggests its 140% growth to revenue of almost £40m has exceeded expectation, whilst growth in Europe was 44% and 42% for the rest of their international operations.

Strong performance was reported in April 2018, when Boohoo announced almost double revenue from the previous year, up to £580 million, a pre-tax profit of £43.3 million and a 22 percent increase in customers.  Boohoo has continued to experience strong performance with the last four-month period for 2019 experiencing a 44% jump in revenue to £328.2m.

In 2020, during the COVID-19 pandemic, Boohoo was reported to have turned a greater profit than in the previous fiscal year. Euronews Living reported at the time that "Boohoo has managed to capitalise on cosy clothing when its customers need comfort above all else." The company revealed a 45% increase in first quarter revenue.

In July 2020, the firm's share price fell 46% following allegations of malpractice at Leicester factories.

References

Retail companies established in 2006
Internet properties established in 2006
Online retailers of the United Kingdom
Companies listed on the Alternative Investment Market
Companies based in Burnley
Companies based in Manchester
Kamani family
British companies established in 2006